Bar Aftab-e Sipeh (also Romanized as Bar Āftāb-e Sīpeh) is a village in Hati Rural District, Hati District, Lali County, Khuzestan Province, Iran. At the 2006 census, its population was 51, in 9 families.

References 

Populated places in Lali County